Michael Dickins Ford (11 June 1928 – 31 May 2018) was an English film art director and set decorator.

Life and career
Born in southern England, Ford trained as an illustrator at Goldsmiths College, London. He worked as a scenic artist before "drifting into" the film industry via commercial television. His first film credit was Man in the Moon (1960); among his first major projects were The Anniversary (1968), with Bette Davis, and Kelly's Heroes (1970).

In 1982, Ford was a co-recipient of the Academy Award for Best Art Direction for his contributions as set decorator to Raiders of the Lost Ark (1981). This was preceded by a nomination for The Empire Strikes Back (1980) and followed by nominations for Return of the Jedi (1983) and Empire of the Sun (1987). He won his second Academy Award in 1998 for his work on Titanic (1997). Ford also served in a design capacity on the James Bond films The Living Daylights (1987), Licence to Kill (1989) and GoldenEye (1995). He died in 2018.

References

External links

A Gallery of Michael Ford's Paintings

1928 births
2018 deaths
20th-century British artists
21st-century British artists
Alumni of Goldsmiths, University of London
Best Art Direction Academy Award winners
English art directors
English illustrators
English set decorators